Danijel Majkić (born 16 December 1987 in Banja Luka, SR Bosnia and Herzegovina, Yugoslavia) is a Bosnian-Herzegovinian professional footballer, who plays for Icelandic team UMF Selfoss.

Club career
On 17 June 2010 Krylia Sovetov Samara signed the Bosnian midfielder from Velež Mostar of the Premier League of Bosnia and Herzegovina.

References

External links
Danijel Majkić at Soccerway

1987 births
Living people
Sportspeople from Banja Luka
Association football midfielders
Bosnia and Herzegovina footballers
Bosnia and Herzegovina under-21 international footballers
FK Velež Mostar players
PFC Krylia Sovetov Samara players
FC Baltika Kaliningrad players
FC Shakhter Karagandy players
FK Leotar players
Al-Ahly SC (Benghazi) players
FC ViOn Zlaté Moravce players
FK Željezničar Banja Luka players
Slovak Super Liga players
Sandvikens IF players
FK Borac Banja Luka players
Platanias F.C. players
Selfoss men's football players
Premier League of Bosnia and Herzegovina players
Russian First League players
Kazakhstan Premier League players
Ettan Fotboll players
Football League (Greece) players
Super League Greece 2 players
2. deild karla players
1. deild karla players
Bosnia and Herzegovina expatriate footballers
Expatriate footballers in Russia
Bosnia and Herzegovina expatriate sportspeople in Russia
Expatriate footballers in Kazakhstan
Bosnia and Herzegovina expatriate sportspeople in Kazakhstan
Expatriate footballers in Libya
Bosnia and Herzegovina expatriate sportspeople in Libya
Expatriate footballers in Slovakia
Bosnia and Herzegovina expatriate sportspeople in Slovakia
Expatriate footballers in Sweden
Bosnia and Herzegovina expatriate sportspeople in Sweden
Expatriate footballers in Greece
Bosnia and Herzegovina expatriate sportspeople in Greece
Expatriate footballers in Iceland
Bosnia and Herzegovina expatriate sportspeople in Iceland
Libyan Premier League players